The Electoral district of Sandhurst was an electoral district of the old unicameral Victorian Legislative Council of 1851 to 1856. Victoria being a colony in Australia at the time.
Sandhurst was added to the Council in 1855, along with four other districts.

The Electoral district of Sandhurst's area included the parishes of Sandhurst, Lockwood, Strathfieldsaye, Sedgwick, Mandurang, 
Huntley, Nerring, Marong, Ravenswood, and Heathcote.

Sandhurst was abolished along with all the other districts in the Legislative Council in 1856 as part of the new Parliament of Victoria. New Provinces were created that made up the Legislative Council, which was the upper house from 1856.

Member

Grant went on to represent the Electoral district of Sandhurst in the new Victorian Legislative Assembly from November 1856.

References

Former electoral districts of Victorian Legislative Council
1855 establishments in Australia
1856 disestablishments in Australia